is a Japanese football player.

Playing career
Miyawaki was born in Hokkaido on January 4, 2001. He joined J1 League club Vegalta Sendai from youth team in 2018.

References

External links

2001 births
Living people
Association football people from Hokkaido
Japanese footballers
J1 League players
Vegalta Sendai players
Association football forwards